Jack Downie (born 23 March 1994) is a Scottish professional footballer who is currently without a club.

Career

Livingston
A member of Livingston's under-19 squad, Downie was promoted to the first team on 3 March 2012, where he was an unused substitute in their defeat to Dundee. He was an unused substitute on one further occasion, before making his debut aged 18, as a substitute on 5 May 2012 in a 1–0 defeat against Dundee. On 4 February 2014, Downie left Livingston.

Berwick Rangers
On 24 February 2014, Downie signed for Berwick Rangers until the end of the 2013–14 season after he'd previously played one match for the club as a trialist.

Career statistics

References

External links
 

1994 births
Living people
Scottish footballers
Association football midfielders
Craigroyston F.C. players
Livingston F.C. players
Berwick Rangers F.C. players
Scottish Football League players
Scottish Professional Football League players
Place of birth missing (living people)